Anatomy of Wonder — A Critical Guide to Science Fiction is a reference book  by Neil Barron, which covers hundreds of works of science fiction.

The review of  Anatomy of Wonder by Dave Langford says that it is a unique reference book that lists hundreds of major SF works from antiquity to 1980, with plot summaries  and recommendations for building up a collection of  SF.

The book was nominated for the Hugo Award for Best Related Work for 1982, but lost to Danse Macabre.

See also
The Encyclopedia of Science Fiction
Encyclopedia of Fantasy
Historical Dictionary of Science Fiction by Brian Stableford

References

External links
 Locus
 Science Fiction Studies
Reviews at ISFDB

Encyclopedias of literature
Science fiction books